General Malek Bin Sulaiman Al Ma'amari is an Omani military and political figure. He was the chairman of the National Committee for Civil Defence until he was dismissed by Sultan Qaboos during 2011 Omani protests.

He was a prominent figure in the media during Cyclone Gonu in 2007.
Until March 15, 2010, he was the Inspector General of Police and Customs for the Royal Oman Police - in short the chief in-charge of the organisation. He was replaced by Lt Gen Hassan bin Mohsin Al Shraiqi via a royal decree issued by the Sultan amidst the 2011 Oman protests.

References

External links
Gulf News

Omani military personnel
Omani politicians
Living people
Year of birth missing (living people)